The Almejas Formation is a geologic formation in Mexico. It preserves fossils dating back to the Late Miocene to Early Pliocene of the Neogene period.

Fossil content 
Various fossils have been found in the formation:

Mammals 

 Aivukus cedrosensis
 Albireo whistleri
 Balaenoptera sp.
 Denebola brachycephala
 Dusignathus santacruzensis
 Parapontoporia pacifica
 Piscolithax boreios
 Piscolithax tedfordi
 aff. Plesiocetus sp.
 Praekogia cedrosensis
 Thalassoleon mexicanus

Birds 

 Cerorhinca minor
 Mancalla cedrosensis
 ?Megapaloelodus opsigonus
 Morus sp.
 Puffinus tedfordi
 ?Synthliboramphus sp.

Fishes 

 Carcharodon cf. carcharias
 Carcharhinus sp.
 Megalodon

See also 

 List of fossiliferous stratigraphic units in Mexico

References 

Geologic formations of Mexico
Neogene Mexico
Sandstone formations
Conglomerate formations
Fossiliferous stratigraphic units of North America
Paleontology in Mexico
Geography of Baja California